Gary Donnelly and Greg Holmes were the defending champions, but did not participate this year.

Grant Connell and Glenn Michibata won the title, defeating Marc Flur and Sammy Giammalva Jr. 2–6, 6–4, 7–5 in the final.

Seeds

  Grant Connell /  Glenn Michibata (champions)
  Marc Flur /  Sammy Giammalva Jr. (final)
  Matt Anger /  Leif Shiras (quarterfinals)
  Paul Annacone /  John Ross (quarterfinals)

Draw

Draw

External links
 Draw

Doubles